Hallgeir Engebråten (born 17 December 1999) is a Norwegian speed skater who participates in national and international competitions in speed skating.

Engebråten made his international debut at the 2018 European Speed Skating Championships at the Kolomna Speed Skating Center in Kolomna, Russia. In 2021, he competed at the 2021 European Speed Skating Championships at Thialf in Heerenveen, Netherlands, where he finished in 5th place. He won the 5000 metres bronze medal at the 2022 Olympics.

Records

Personal records

Engebråten occupies the 29th position on the adelskalender, with a score of 147.658 points.

References

External links 
 
 
 

1999 births
Norwegian male speed skaters
Living people
Speed skaters at the 2022 Winter Olympics
Medalists at the 2022 Winter Olympics
Olympic medalists in speed skating
Olympic gold medalists for Norway
Olympic bronze medalists for Norway
Olympic speed skaters of Norway
21st-century Norwegian people